The D+D Real Slovakia Challenge is a golf tournament on the Challenge Tour. It was first played in July 2014 at the Penati Golf Resort in Senica, Slovakia. It was the first Challenge Tour event played in Slovakia. The event was not held in 2017 or 2018 but returned in 2019.

Winners

References

External links
Coverage on the Challenge Tour's official site

Former Challenge Tour events
Golf in Slovakia
Recurring sporting events established in 2014
Summer events in Slovakia